Erik Rengifo (born November 8, 1989 in Woodhaven, New York) is an American soccer player who is currently without a club.

Career

College and amateur
Rengifo attended Beach Channel High School, leading his team to the PSAL quarterfinals in back-to-back seasons in 2005 and 2006, and played club soccer for Blau-Weiss Gottschee, before beginning his college soccer career at Molloy College in 2007. He transferred to Hofstra University prior to his junior season in 2008, and spent three years with the Pride.

During his college years he also had two stints with Brooklyn Knights in the USL Premier Development League, in 2008 and 2010, as well as a season playing for the Long Island Academy team in the National Premier Soccer League.

Rengifo is in his 3rd year of teaching Spanish in the Queens public school, P.S.183Q.

Professional
Rengifo signed his first professional contract in 2011 when he was signed by F.C. New York of the USL Professional Division. He made his professional debut on May 30, 2011 in a 2-1 win over the Rochester Rhinos.

International
Rengifo, who has Colombian ancestry, has youth international caps for the United States, having played for the USA Under-18 team in the World Championships in Osaka, Japan in 2007.

References

External links
 Hofstra bio
 InfoSport profile

1989 births
Living people
American soccer players
Hofstra Pride men's soccer players
Brooklyn Knights players
F.C. New York players
USL League Two players
USL Championship players
Association football defenders
People from Woodhaven, Queens
Sportspeople from Queens, New York
Soccer players from New York City
Molloy Lions men's soccer players